Dumbing down is the deliberate oversimplification of intellectual content in education, literature, and cinema, news, video games, and culture. Originated in 1933, the term "dumbing down" was movie-business slang, used by screenplay writers, meaning: "[to] revise so as to appeal to those of little education or intelligence". Dumbing-down varies according to subject matter, and usually involves the diminishment of critical thought by undermining standard language and learning standards, thus trivializing academic standards, culture, and meaningful information, as in the case of popular culture.

In Distinction: A Social Critique of the Judgement of Taste (1979), the sociologist Pierre Bourdieu (1930–2002) proposed that, in a society in which the cultural practices of the ruling class are rendered and established as the legitimate culture, said distinction then devalues the cultural capital of the subordinate middle- and working- classes, and thus limits their social mobility within their own society.

Education
In the late 20th century, the proportion of young people attending university in the UK increased sharply, including many who previously would not have been considered to possess the appropriate scholastic aptitude. In 2003, the UK Minister for Universities, Margaret Hodge, criticised Mickey Mouse degrees as a negative consequence of universities dumbing down their courses to meet "the needs of the market": these degrees are conferred for studies in a field of endeavour "where the content is perhaps not as [intellectually] rigorous as one would expect, and where the degree, itself, may not have huge relevance in the labour market": thus, a university degree of slight intellectual substance, which the student earned by "simply stacking up numbers on Mickey Mouse courses, is not acceptable".

In Dumbing Us Down: The Hidden Curriculum of Compulsory Schooling (1991, 2002), John Taylor Gatto presented speeches and essays, including "The Psychopathic School", his acceptance speech for the 1990 New York City Teacher of the Year award, and "The Seven-Lesson Schoolteacher", his acceptance speech upon being named as the New York State Teacher of the Year for 1991. Gatto writes that while he was hired to teach English and literature, he came to believe he was employed as part of a social engineering project. The "seven lessons" at the foundation of schooling were never explicitly stated, Gatto writes, but included teaching students that their self-worth depended on outside evaluation; that they were constantly ranked and supervised; and that they had no opportunities for privacy or solitude. Gatto speculated:

In examining the seven lessons of teaching, Gatto concluded that "all of these lessons are prime training for permanent underclasses, people deprived forever of finding the center of their own special genius". That "school is a twelve-year jail sentence, where bad habits are the only curriculum truly learned. I teach school, and win awards doing it. I should know."

Mass communications media

In France, Michel Houellebecq has written (not excluding himself) of "the shocking dumbing-down of French culture and intellect as was recently pointed out, [2008] sternly but fairly, by Time magazine".

In popular culture
The science fiction film Idiocracy (2006) portrays the U.S. as a greatly dumbed-down society 500 years in the future, in which low culture and philistinism were unintentionally achieved by eroding language and education coupled with dysgenics, where people of lower intelligence reproduced faster than the people of higher intelligence. Similar concepts appeared in earlier works, notably the science fiction short story "The Marching Morons" (1951), by Cyril M. Kornbluth which also features a modern-day protagonist in a future dominated by low-intelligence persons. Moreover, the novel Brave New World (1931), by Aldous Huxley, discussed the ways a utopian society was deliberately dumbed down in order to maintain political stability and social order by eliminating complex concepts unnecessary for society to function (e.g., the Savage tries reading Shakespeare to the masses and is not understood). More malevolent uses of dumbing down to preserve the social order are also portrayed in The Matrix, Nineteen Eighty-Four and many dystopian movies.

The social critic Paul Fussell touched on these themes ("prole drift") in his non-fiction book Class: A Guide Through the American Status System (1983) and focused on them specifically in BAD: or, The Dumbing of America (1991).

The musical groups the Divine Comedy, Ugly Duckling, and Lupe Fiasco each have a song titled "Dumb It Down". Chumbawamba released one titled "Dumbing Down".

See also

Further reading 
A compilation of essays by philosophers, politicians, artists and thinkers titled Dumbing Down was published by Imprint Academic in 2000, edited by Ivo Mosley and included essays by Jaron Lanier, Claire Fox, Ravi Shankar, Robert Brustein, Michael Oakshott, Roger Deakin and Peter Randall-Page among others.
  (collection of essays)

References

External links
 "Is the internet dumbing us down?" MSNBC review of The Cult of the Amateur: How Today's Internet is Killing Our Culture, by Andrew Keen

English phrases
Mass media issues
Education issues
Criticism of journalism